Archips micaceana is a moth of the family Tortricidae. It is found in China, Hong Kong, southern Vietnam, Burma, and northern Thailand. It is a minor pest of many agricultural crops.

The hindwings are almost entirely yellow in both sexes.

Food
The larvae are polyphagous leaf-tiers and leaf-rollers on: 
 
 Abelmoschus esculentus
 Acacia nilotica
 Alangium salviifolium
 Albizzia procera
 Albizzia saman
 Aleurites
 Annona reticulata
 Annona squamosa
 Arachis hypogaea
 Areca catechu
 Artabotrys hexapetalus
 Artocarpus heterophyllus
 Aster
 Azadirachta excelsa
 Breonia chinensis
 Camellia
 Capsicum
 Cassia fistula
 Castanopsis fissa
 Cedrela
 Chrysanthemum
 Citrus maxima
 Codiaeum variegatum
 Coffea
 Cordyline fruticosa
 Cosmos
 Cuscuta
 Dalbergia sissoo
 Delonix regia
 Derris
 Dillenia indica
 Dimocarpus longan
 Duranta
 Erythrina fusca
 Erythrina variegata
 Eucalyptus camaldulensis
 Eugenia
 Fragaria
 Garcinia mangostana
 Gerbera jamesonii
 Glycine max
 Gmelina arborea
 Gossypium herbaceum
 Helianthus annuus
 Hibiscus
 Hopea odorata
 Ixora
 Lagerstroemia cuspidata
 Lantana camara
 Linum
 Litchi chinensis
 Lonicera japonica
 Ludwigia
 Macropiper excelsum
 Mallotus philippinensis
 Malus pumila
 Mangifera indica
 Medicago
 Michelia champaca
 Millettia extensa
 Morus alba
 Nephelium lappaceum
 Persea americana
 Phaseolus
 Pinus caribaea
 Pithecellobium dulce
 Psidium guajava
 Punica granatum
 Rhizophora mucronata
 Ricinus communis
 Salix
 Santalum album
 Schoutenia glomerata
 Shorea talura
 Spergularia macrotheca
 Syzygium aquem
 Syzygium cumini
 Terminalia elliptica
 Toona ciliata
 Triticum aestivum
 Vicia faba
 Vigna radiata
 Zea mays 
 Ziziphus mauritiana

References

Moths described in 1863
Archips
Moths of Asia